The 2018–19 season is Everton Ladies Football Club's second season competing in the FA Women's Super League since being promoted after winning the 2017 WSL2 Spring Series, and being one of the league's foundation clubs.

Ahead of the 2018–19 season, Everton announced that they would play the first half of the season at Merseyrail Community Stadium.

Review
After going winless in the league for the first six matches reaching bottom of the table, Everton sacked longtime manager Andy Spence and appointed goalkeeper coach, Jennifer Herst, as interim manager. On 1 December Willie Kirk was announced as manager for the Ladies first team.

First team

Coaching staff

Transfers

In

Out

Loan Out

Competitions

Preseason friendlies

Women's Super League

League table

Results summary

Results by matchday

Matches

FA WSL Cup 

Everton was drawn into Group Two North for the 2018–19 FA WSL Cup. Despite opening the tournament with a win over Reading, Everton was officially eliminated from qualifying to the Quarter Finals after a home loss to Manchester United.

FA Cup

Statistics

Players without any appearance are not included.

|-
|colspan="14"|Goalkeepers:
|-

|-
|colspan="14"|Defenders:
|-

|-
|colspan="14"|Midfielders:
|-

|-
|colspan="14"|Forwards:
|-

Honours

References

Everton F.C. (women) seasons
Everton